Monkeys, Go Home! is a 1967 American comedy film produced by Walt Disney Productions and directed by Andrew V. McLaglen. The movie stars Maurice Chevalier,  Dean Jones, and Yvette Mimieux. Aside from contributing to the soundtrack of Disney's animated film The Aristocats (1970), this was Chevalier's final film role.

Released on February 8, 1967, this was the first feature-length film released by Walt Disney Productions since the founder's death nearly two months earlier.

Plot
Hank Dussard (Jones), the new owner of an olive grove in Provence, France, brings in trained chimpanzee  labor, which upsets other workers. Hank eventually gains the town's confidence with the kind aid of Father Sylvain (Chevalier) and his neighbor Maria Riserau (Mimieux).

Cast
Maurice Chevalier as Father Sylvain
Dean Jones as Hank Dussard
Yvette Mimieux as Maria Riserau
Bernard Woringer as Marcel Cartucci
Clément Harari as Emile Paurilis
Yvonne Constant as Yolande Angelli 
Marcel Hillaire as Mayor Gaston Lou 
Jules Munshin as Monsieur Piastillio 
Alan Carney as Grocer 
Maurice Marsac as Fontanino
Darleen Carr as Sidoni Riserau

Reception
Vincent Canby of The New York Times called it "another of those bland little confections turned out regularly by the Disney studio." Arthur D. Murphy of Variety declared it "an amusing comedy-romance" with "the usual professional Disney blend of children, animals, humor and charm." Kevin Thomas of the Los Angeles Times called it "a typical Disney family film ... Sophisticates, stay home." The Monthly Film Bulletin wrote, "Olive farming certainly provides an unusual background, but otherwise all is innocuous, extrovertly cheerful and good-humoured—and very dull."

References

External links
 
 
 
 

1967 films
1967 comedy films
American comedy films
Walt Disney Pictures films
Films directed by Andrew McLaglen
Films produced by Walt Disney
Films about apes
Films set in France
Films shot in France
1960s English-language films
1960s American films